

The Koolhoven F.K.53 Junior was a small sport aircraft built in the Netherlands in 1936. It was a low-wing cantilever monoplane of conventional design, with tandem seating for two under a long canopy. The wings had a gull shape and carried the main units of the tailwheel undercarriage. Two examples were built, and both destroyed in the German bombing of Waalhaven in May 1940. The first machine built had been purchased by the Dutch national flying school.

Specifications

References

 
 
 Koolhoven Aeroplanes Foundation
 Уголок неба

1930s Dutch sport aircraft
F.K.53
Low-wing aircraft
Aircraft first flown in 1936
Gull-wing aircraft
Single-engined tractor aircraft